Erik Meijer (born 18 April 1963, Curaçao) is a Dutch computer scientist, entrepreneur, and tie-dye enthusiast. From 2000 to early 2013 he was a software architect for Microsoft where he headed the Cloud Programmability Team. He then founded Applied Duality Inc. in 2013. Before that, he was an associate professor at Utrecht University. Since 2015 he has been a Director of Engineering at Facebook. He received his Ph.D. from Nijmegen University in 1992.

Meijer's research has included the areas of functional programming (particularly Haskell)
compiler implementation, parsing, programming language design, XML, and foreign function interfaces.

His work at Microsoft included C#, Visual Basic, LINQ, Volta, and the reactive programming framework (Reactive Extensions) for the .NET Framework.

In 2009, he was the recipient of the Microsoft Outstanding Technical Leadership Award and in 2007 the Outstanding Technical Achievement Award as a member of the C# team.

Meijer lived in the Netherlands Antilles until the age 14 when his father retired from his job and the family moved back to the Netherlands.

In 2011 Erik Meijer was appointed part-time professor of Cloud Programming within the Software Engineering Research Group at Delft University of Technology. He is also member of the ACM Queue Editorial Board. Since 2013 he is also Honorary Professor of Programming Language Design at the School of Computer Science of the University of Nottingham, associated with the Functional Programming Laboratory.

In early 2013 Erik Meijer left Microsoft and started Applied Duality Incorporated. During this period he worked on the Hack language with Facebook, RxJava library with Netflix and Dart language with Google.

On Christmas 2014 Erik Meijer was diagnosed with chronic myelogenous leukemia and suffered a close to death experience for which he was hospitalized.

He teaches a course on the MOOC provider Coursera, called "Principles of Reactive Programming", and a course on edX called "Introduction to Functional Programming".

References

External links

 List of Erik Meijer's publications available from DBLP.

1963 births
Living people
Dutch computer scientists
Functional programming
Programming language researchers
Radboud University Nijmegen alumni
Utrecht University alumni
Academic staff of the Delft University of Technology
Microsoft employees